BellSouth Long Distance, Inc. consists of the long distance operations of AT&T serving BellSouth Telecommunications customers. BSLD was acquired by AT&T in 2006 when it purchased BellSouth Corporation.

BSLD does business as AT&T Long Distance Service.

References

AT&T subsidiaries